Tim Tscharnke (born 13 December 1989 in Weissenfels) is a former cross-country skier from Germany, who competed  between and 2017. He has two victories in the World Cup, his first in the 2012-2013 season in Canmore and his second during the 2015 Tour de Ski in Val di Fiemme. His club is SV Biberau. He speaks German, Russian, and English.

He won silver with Axel Teichmann in the Team Sprint at the 2010 Winter Olympics in Vancouver.

Cross-country skiing results
All results are sourced from the International Ski Federation (FIS).

Olympic Games
 1 medal – (1 silver)

World Championships

World Cup

Season standings

Individual podiums
2 victories – (1 , 1 )
2 podiums – (1 , 1 )

Team podiums

 2 podiums – (1 , 1 )

References

External links
 

1989 births
Living people
German male cross-country skiers
Tour de Ski skiers
Cross-country skiers at the 2010 Winter Olympics
Cross-country skiers at the 2014 Winter Olympics
Olympic cross-country skiers of Germany
Olympic silver medalists for Germany
Olympic medalists in cross-country skiing
Medalists at the 2010 Winter Olympics